The 1963 Argentine Primera División was the 72nd season of top-flight football in Argentina. The season began on April 28 and ended on November 24.

Independiente won its 7th championship, with no teams relegated so the relegation was suspended. Therefore Estudiantes de la Plata (the last of the table by average system) was saved.

League standings

References

Argentine Primera División seasons
Argentine Primera Division
1